The 2018 Nebraska Cornhuskers football team represented the University of Nebraska in the 2018 NCAA Division I FBS football season. The team was coached by first-year head coach Scott Frost and played their home games at Memorial Stadium in Lincoln, Nebraska. They competed as members of the West Division of the Big Ten Conference.

After Nebraska's season opener against Akron was canceled due to inclement weather, the Cornhuskers began the season with six straight losses, the worst start in program history. This, combined with their four losses at the end of 2017, formed a school-record 10-game losing streak. The team's performance improved in the second half of the season, and the team won four of their last six games to finish at 4–8 overall.

Freshman quarterback Adrian Martinez led the team on offense, finishing with 2,617 passing yards, 17 passing touchdowns, and 8 rushing touchdowns. Senior running back Devine Ozigbo finished with 1,082 rushing yards and 12 touchdowns, becoming the first Nebraska running back to exceed 1,000 rushing yards since Ameer Abdullah in 2014. Senior wide receiver Stanley Morgan Jr. finished with 1,004 receiving yards and was named second-team All-Big Ten. Linebacker Mohamed Barry led the team in tackles.

Previous season
The Cornhuskers finished the 2017 season 4–8 and 3–6 in Big Ten conference play, a fifth-place finish in the West Division. On November 25, 2017, the school fired head coach Mike Riley after three seasons. On December 2, the school hired UCF head coach and Nebraska alum, Scott Frost, as head coach.

Offseason

Recruiting

Position key

Recruits
The Cornhuskers signed a total of 12 recruits during the Early Signing Period from December 20–22, 2017.

Scholarship recruits

Walk-on recruits

Transfers

Outgoing

Incoming

Spring scrimmage

Preseason

Award watch lists

Schedule
The 2018 schedule consisted of seven home and five away games in the regular season. Nebraska hosted conference foes Purdue, Minnesota, Illinois, and Michigan State and the Cornhuskers traveled to play Michigan, Wisconsin, Northwestern, Ohio State, and Iowa in Big Ten play.

The game between Nebraska and Akron, originally scheduled for September 1, 2018, was canceled due to inclement weather. Nebraska finalized an agreement to play Bethune–Cookman on October 27 at Memorial Stadium to fill an opening on the schedule that replaced the Huskers’ September 1 game against Akron.

Roster and coaching staff

Depth chart

Game summaries

Colorado

Sources:

Colorado Game starters

Troy

Sources:

Troy Game starters

at Michigan

Sources:

Michigan Game starters

Purdue

Sources:

Purdue Game starters

at Wisconsin

Sources:

Wisconsin Game starters

at Northwestern

Sources:

Northwestern Game starters

Minnesota

Sources:

Minnesota Game starters

After starting the season 0-6, Nebraska finally got its first win under Scott Frost against Minnesota

Bethune–Cookman

Sources:

Bethune-Cookman Game starters

at Ohio State

Sources:

Ohio State Game starters

Illinois

Sources:

Illinois Game starters

Michigan State

Sources:

Michigan State Game starters

at Iowa

Sources:

Iowa Game starters

Big Ten Awards

Player of the Week Honors

All-Conference Awards

2018 Big Ten All-Conference Teams and Awards

References

Nebraska
Nebraska Cornhuskers football seasons
Nebraska Cornhuskers football